The Mdivani is a Georgian family. In the West, the best known bearers of this name were the children of General Zakhari Mdivani (1867-1933) and his wife, Elizabeth Viktorovna Sabalewska (1884-1922). The five siblings fled to Paris after the Soviet invasion of Georgia in 1921, and became known as the "Marrying Mdivanis", as they all married into wealth and fame. 

The Mdivani siblings were:
Nina Mdivani (1901–1987), who was married to Charles Henry Huberich, a Stanford professor and lawyer, from 15 July 1925 until their divorce on 19 May 1936. On 18 August 1936 she married Denis Conan Doyle, a son of Sir Arthur Conan Doyle, the creator of Sherlock Holmes. After Denis's death on 9 March 1955, she married Anthony Harwood, a secretary to Denis Conan Doyle.
Serge Mdivani (1903–1936), came to Massachusetts in 1921 with his brother David and was supported by Marshall Crane of the Crane Currency paper empire. By 1923, the brothers moved out and ended up working in the Oklahoma oil fields owned by Edward L. Doheny. Serge then moved to Los Angeles, met, and married actress Pola Negri in 1927, but when she lost her fortune in the Stock Market Crash of 1929, he abandoned her and took up with opera singer Mary McCormic, who divorced him in a highly publicized trial. He then married his former sister-in-law, Louise Astor Van Alen Mdivani, in 1936, but died later that year in a polo accident. He is buried in the church yard of St. Columba's Episcopal Chapel in Middletown, Rhode Island, under a massive marble tombstone.

David Mdivani (1904–1984), was the first Mdivani to marry "well". He came to the US with his brother Serge under the support of Marshall Crane. When the two brothers fell out of favor with Marshall Crane, they moved to New York where David was working for a radio repair shop owned by a fellow Georgian refuge on Vesey Street in New York City. David also dabbled in acting, but failed. The brothers moved to Oklahoma where David and Serge worked in the Edward L. Doheny oil fields earning $25 per week up until 1926, just months before David married actress Mae Murray; they had a son, Koran David (1926-2018). After he bankrupted her, she divorced him in 1933 and they became involved in a fierce custody battle over their child. He was involved with French actress Arletty. David then married Sinclair Oil heiress Virginia Sinclair (daughter of Harry Ford Sinclair) in 1944, and they had a son, Michael (1945–1990).

Alexis Mdivani (1905–1935), who married Louise Astor Van Alen (a member of the Astor family) in 1931, but divorced her to marry Woolworth heiress Barbara Hutton, one of the world's richest women at the time. He died in an automobile accident in Albons, Catalonia (Spain), while he was traveling with Baroness Maud Thyssen, a beautiful, married, twenty-three year old German.

Isabelle Roussadana Mdivani (1906–1938), aka Roussie or Roussy. A sculptor, she married the Spanish painter Josep Maria Sert in 1928.

The word "Mdivani" in Georgian means member of the Divan "Secretary".

Notable members 
Polikarp Mdivani
Marina Mdivani

References

External links
 How an Early Hollywood Family Became the Original Kardashians. Los Angeles Magazine, December 2016

Nobility of Georgia (country)
Families of Georgia (country)
Woolworth family
Georgian words and phrases
Georgian-language surnames
Astor family